Captain Mateen Ahmed Ansari GC (15 December 1916 – 29 October 1943) of the 5th Battalion, 7th Rajput Regiment, in the Indian Army during World War II, and member of the British Army Aid Group.
 He was awarded the George Cross posthumously. The decoration, the highest British (and Commonwealth) award for bravery out of combat, was announced in a supplement to the London Gazette of 16 April 1946 as being awarded for the 'most conspicuous gallantry.'

He was taken prisoner when Japan occupied Hong Kong in December 1941 after the Battle of Hong Kong. After the Japanese discovered that he was related to the ruler of one of the Princely States they demanded that he renounce his allegiance to the British and foment discontent in the ranks of Indian prisoners in the prison camps.  He refused and was thrown into the notorious Stanley Jail in May 1942 where he was starved and brutalised. And also held in Ma Tau Chung Camp, where he expended efforts to counter Japanese recruiting work for the collaborationist Indian National Army. When he remained firm in his allegiance to the British on his return to the prison camps he was again incarcerated in Stanley Jail where he was starved and tortured for five months. He was then returned to the original camp, where he continued in his allegiance to the British, and even helped to organise escape attempts by other prisoners.  He was sentenced to death, with over thirty other British, Chinese and Indian prisoners and beheaded on 29 October 1943.  He is buried in Stanley Military Cemetery in Hong Kong.

See also
List of George Cross recipients

References

External links
CWGC: Mateen Ansari

British Indian Army officers
Indian recipients of the George Cross
Executed Indian people
World War II prisoners of war held by Japan
1916 births
1943 deaths
Indian prisoners of war
Indian people executed abroad
20th-century executions by Japan
People executed by Japan by decapitation
Indian Army personnel killed in World War II
Indian torture victims
Burials at Stanley Military Cemetery
Military personnel of British India